Neethling is a surname. Notable people with the surname include:

Andre Neethling (born 1979), Zimbabwean cricketer
Anna Neethling-Pohl (1906–1992), South African actress, performer and film producer
Candice Neethling, South African cross-country mountain biker
Coetie Neethling (1932–2015), South African cricketer
Johannes Neethling (1770-1838), South African judge
Lothar Neethling (1935–2005), South African police officer
Ryk Neethling (born 1977), South African businessman